Sheriff is a political or legal office, varying greatly between countries.

Sheriff or Sherriff may also refer to:

People

Surname
 Alexander Clunes Sheriff (1816–1878), English businessman and Member of Parliament (MP) for Worcester 1865–78
 Frank Sheriff (born 1957), abstract sculptor
 Mary Sheriff, American art historian
 Noam Sheriff (born 1935), conductor, composer, and arranger
 Paula G. Sherriff, British Labour Party politician, Member of Parliament (MP) for Dewsbury since 2015
 R. C. Sherriff (1896–1975), writer, novelist and playwright
 Ryan Sherriff (born 1990), American Major League Baseball player

Nickname or pseudonym
 Eli Cohen (footballer, born 1951), Israeli soccer player and manager nicknamed "The Sheriff"
 Del Gainer (1886–1947), American Major League Baseball player nicknamed "Sheriff"
 Peyton Manning (born 1976), American retired National Football League player nicknamed "The Sheriff"
 Ken Owens (born 1987), Welsh rugby player nicknamed "The Sheriff"

Arts and entertainment
Sheriff (band), a Canadian rock band from the early 1980s
 Sheriff (album)
 The Sheriff (album)
 The Sheriff, a track on the 1972 album Trilogy by Emerson, Lake & Palmer
 The Sheriff, a 1918 film starring Fatty Arbuckle
 The Sheriff (1959 film)
 Sheriff (Cars), a character from the Cars franchise
 Sheriff (video game), an arcade game by Nintendo in 1979

Other uses
 Sheriff Mountain, Montana, United States
 Sheriff (company), a Transnistrian (Moldovan) conglomerate
 Sheriff (Slovenia), a term coined by the Slovenian media in reference to local politicians faced with accusations of political corruption and with criminal investigations
 Sheriff (weapon), a crowd-control vehicle of the U.S. military
FC Sheriff Tiraspol, a Moldovan football club founded by the company

See also 
 Sharif (disambiguation)
 Sherif, given name and surname

Lists of people by nickname